South Wayne Historic District is a national historic district located in Wayne, Delaware County, Pennsylvania.  The district includes 316 contributing buildings in a residential area of Wayne.  The majority of the dwellings were built between 1881 and 1930, and include notable examples of Shingle Style and Colonial Revival architecture, representing the work of Will Price, Horace Trumbauer, and several other architects.

The district reflects suburban development in the late-19th century as it was a major component of a large, planned, railroad commuter suburb called "the Wayne Estates," complementing the northern half of the residential area which is now included in the North Wayne Historic District, and the downtown area of Wayne, which sits between the two residential districts, now the Downtown Wayne Historic District.

It was added to the National Register of Historic Places in 1991.

References

Historic districts on the National Register of Historic Places in Pennsylvania
Historic districts in Delaware County, Pennsylvania
National Register of Historic Places in Delaware County, Pennsylvania
Radnor Township, Delaware County, Pennsylvania